In the men's singles final, Gastón Gaudio defeated Tommy Robredo with a score of 6–1, 2–6, 6–1.

Seeds

Draw

Finals

Top half

Bottom half

External links
 Men's Singles draw
 Men's Qualifying draw

2005 Estoril Open